Itajara was an undefeated Brazilian Thoroughbred racehorse who won the Brazilian Triple Crown and is considered by many to be the greatest Brazilian racehorse.

Background 
Itajara was bred by Haras São José e Expedictus, out of the homebred graded stakes winner Apple Honey. His sire Felicio was a Group One stakes winner in his native France who had become a successful sire in Brazil.

Racing career 
Itajara won all seven of his starts, all of them run at Hipódromo da Gávea. He was trained by Francisco Saraiva and ridden by José Ferreira dos Reis in all of his races. Itajara won at distances from 1100 to 3000 meters, on both dirt and turf tracks. Itajara won four group one races, including the Brazilian Rio de Janeiro Triple Crown.

Stud record 
After his racing career, Itajara was retired to stand at stud at Haras São José e Expedictus in 1987, where he was stabled next to Derek, another unbeaten racehorse bred by the Haras. 

In 1993, Itajara was exported to Argentina, where he stood that year at stud at Haras El Alfalfar, covering 42 mares. He died there on February 20, 1994, before the next breeding season.

Itajara is the sire of G1 winners Siphon and Ozanam, as well as several other graded stakes winners.

Pedigree

See also 
 List of leading Thoroughbred racehorses

References 

Racehorses bred in Brazil
Brazilian racehorses
1983 racehorse births
1994 racehorse deaths
Undefeated racehorses
Thoroughbred family 27-a
Racehorses trained in Brazil